

1993 Designation
Due to the restructuring that carried out the Miss Peru Organization, Déborah D'Souza Peixoto was appointed to represent Peru in the  Miss Universe 1993 pageant by Mr. Benjamin Kreimer (president of Miss Peru Org).

On May 1, D'Souza traveled to Mexico City, Mexico to compete in the Miss Universe 1993 pageant which was held on May 21. She reached the 11th position, with 8.937 as Average Preliminary Score.

Mónika Saez Grimm, Miss Peru Asia-Pacific 1992, was appointed to represent Peru in the Miss World 1993 pageant, but was difficult for her to find a sponsor and that she would NO longer be able to fund the trip to South Africa.

Placements

References

Miss Peru
1993 in Peru
1993 beauty pageants